Hippopsis campaneri is a species of beetle in the family Cerambycidae. It was described by Martins and Galileo in 1998.

References

Hippopsis
Beetles described in 1998